|}

The Phoenix Sprint Stakes is a Group 3 flat horse race in Ireland open to thoroughbreds aged three years or older. It is run at the Curragh over a distance of 6 furlongs (1,207 metres), and it is scheduled to take place each year in August.

The event was formerly held at Phoenix Park, and for a period it was known as the Matt Gallagher Sprint Stakes. It was staged at the Curragh in 1982, and it returned to its usual venue the following year. The race was transferred to Leopardstown in 1991.

The Phoenix Sprint Stakes began its present spell at the Curragh in 2002. It was temporarily switched to Leopardstown in 2008, as the planned running at the Curragh was abandoned due to waterlogging.

Records
Most successful horse since 1978 (2 wins):
 Acushla – 1986, 1987
 Gustavus Weston – 2019, 2021
 Snaefell – 2008, 2010

Leading jockey since 1978 (3 wins):
 Michael Kinane – Jester (1983), Northern Goddess (1990), Tropical (1993)

Leading trainer since 1978 (3 wins):

 Michael Halford – Snaefell (2008, 2010), Toscanini (2016)

Winners since 1978

See also
 Horse racing in Ireland
 List of Irish flat horse races

References
 Racing Post:
 galopp-sieger.de – Phoenix Sprint Stakes.
 ifhaonline.org – International Federation of Horseracing Authorities – Phoenix Sprint Stakes (2019).
 irishracinggreats.com – Phoenix Sprint Stakes (Group 3).
 pedigreequery.com – Phoenix Sprint Stakes.

Flat races in Ireland
Curragh Racecourse
Open sprint category horse races